The University of North Korean Studies is a university in Seoul, South Korea that was founded in 2005 by merging Kyungnam University's North Korean studies department founded in 1997 and the Far East Problems Research Centre (극동문제연구소) founded 1972.

See also
 North Korean studies

References

External links

Universities and colleges in Seoul
Private universities and colleges in South Korea
Jongno District
North
2005 establishments in South Korea